The molecular formula C13H18ClNO2 (molar mass: 255.74 g/mol, exact mass: 255.1026 u) may refer to:

 Alaproclate
 Cloforex (Oberex)
 Hydroxybupropion
 Radafaxine

Molecular formulas